The 2018–19 South Carolina Gamecocks men's basketball team represented the University of South Carolina during the 2018–19 NCAA Division I men's basketball season. The team's head coach, Frank Martin, was in his seventh season at South Carolina. The team played its home games at Colonial Life Arena in Columbia, South Carolina as a member of the Southeastern Conference. They finished the season 16-16, 11-7 in SEC Play to finish a tie for 4th place. They lost in the quarterfinals of the SEC tournament to Auburn.

Previous season
The Gamecocks finished the 2017–18 season finished the season 17–16, 7–11 in SEC play to finish in a tie for 11th place. They had 3 wins against ranked teams; No. 10 Auburn, No. 18 Kentucky, and No. 20 Florida. They defeated Ole Miss in the first round of the SEC tournament before losing in the second round to Arkansas.

Offseason

Departures

Incoming transfers

2018 recruiting class

Roster

Schedule and results

|-
!colspan=12 style=|Exhibition

|-
!colspan=12 style=| Regular season

|-
!colspan=12 style= | SEC tournament

References

South Carolina Gamecocks men's basketball seasons
Gamecocks
South Carolina
Gamecocks